Elections for 7th Provincial assembly of Sindh, Pakistan were held on 28 February 1985, following the general elections on 25 February, along with the provincial elections of Punjab, Balochistan & N.W.F.P under the Military rule of General Zia-ul-Haq.

List of members of the 7th Provincial Assembly of Sindh 
Tenure of the 6th Provincial assembly of Sindh was from 28 February 1985 till 30 May 1988.

References 

Provincial Assembly of Sindh
Politics of Sindh
1985 elections in Pakistan